The Hong Kong tailors are a well-known attraction in Hong Kong. Hong Kong is still home to several bespoke tailors, who have stitched suits for foreign politicians like Bill Clinton, George W Bush, Margaret Thatcher, Tony Blair and Bob Hawke and celebrities like Prince Charles, Kevin Spacey, Boris Becker, David Bowie, Richard Gere and Michael Jackson.

Some of the tailors are famous for the “24-hour suit,” for rushed travelers, although most suits involves 2-3 fittings, each a day apart. Many of the Hong Kong tailors visit the United States and the United Kingdom to take measurements and show fabric samples, with the final suit delivered by parcel.

Tailoring for the upper class in Hong Kong goes back to 1920s where there were about 600 people engaged in the business. During 1960s there were as many as 15,000 tailors. In 1966, the South China Morning Post ran a headline declaring that London's Savile Row, until then the undisputed international center of bespoke tailoring, had been replaced by Hong Kong. In the 1970s and 80s, ready-made suits became widely available, causing a decline in the number of tailors.  Hong Kong remains a major location where travelers consider getting a suit.

Hari Harilela of the Harilela Group, now major Hong Kong financiers, started a clothing-cum-tailoring shop in Hong Kong during the 1940s and 50s. He pioneered the idea of supplying custom-made suits by mail order. He realised in 1960 that the mail order boom is a temporary phase, so he diversified into real estate. A number of Indians, mainly from Sindh, arrived in 1950, who are still in the tailoring business. Many tailors, such as Yuen's Tailor, are ethnic Chinese.

Traveling tailors
Many Hong Kong tailors travel to the United States, the United Kingdom, France, Australia and Japan.
Traveling tailors provide a more personal service to their customers and give the customers an opportunity to see the fabric samples and meet the tailor in person. Traveling tailors travel between cities and station in a local luxury hotel for a short period of time to meet and provide the same tailoring services they would provide in their local store. In the hotel, the customer will be able to select the fabric from samples and the tailor will take the measurements himself. The order then will be shipped to the customer within three to four weeks' time. Unlike local tailoring, if further alterations are required the garment must be shipped.

See also
 Bespoke tailoring
 Savile Row tailoring
 Ascot Chang
 Raja Fashions
 Sam's Tailor
 Indians in Hong Kong

References

High fashion brands
Luxury brands
Suit makers
Clothing companies of Hong Kong